Charlie Sullivan may refer to:

 Charlie Sullivan (baseball) (1903–1935), Major League Baseball pitcher
 Charlie Sullivan (curler) (born 1968), Canadian curler
 Charlie Sullivan, Sr., Canadian curler, see 2012 Canadian Masters Curling Championships

See also
Charles Sullivan (disambiguation)